Ormolu (from French or moulu, "ground/pounded gold") is the gilding technique of applying finely ground, high-carat gold–mercury amalgam to an object of bronze, and for objects finished in this way. The mercury is driven off in a kiln leaving behind a gold coating.  The French refer to this technique as "bronze doré"; in English, it is known as "gilt bronze".  Around 1830, legislation in France had outlawed the use of mercury for health reasons, though use continued to the 1900s.

Craftsmen principally used ormolu for the decorative mountings of furniture, clocks, lighting devices, and porcelain.

Process

The manufacture of true ormolu employs a process known as mercury-gilding or fire-gilding, in which a solution of mercuric nitrate is applied to a piece of copper, brass, or bronze; followed by the application of an amalgam of gold and mercury.  The item is then exposed to extreme heat until the mercury vaporizes and the gold remains, adhering to the metal object.

This process has generally been supplanted by the electroplating of gold over a nickel substrate, which is more economical and less dangerous.

Health risk
In literature there is a 1612 reference from John Webster:

After around 1830, legislation in France had outlawed the use of mercury, although it continued to be commonly employed until around 1900 and was still in use around 1960 in very few workshops. Other gilding techniques, like electroplating from the mid-19th century on, were utilized. Ormolu techniques are essentially the same as those used on silver, to produce silver-gilt (also known as vermeil).

Alternatives
A later substitute of a mixture of metals resembling ormolu was developed in France and called pomponne, though the mix of copper and zinc, sometimes with an addition of tin, is technically a type of brass. From the 19th century the term has been popularized to refer to gilt metal or imitation gold.

Gilt-bronze is found from antiquity onwards across Eurasia, and especially in Chinese art, where it was always more common than silver-gilt, the opposite of Europe.

Applications
Craftsmen principally used ormolu for the decorative mountings of furniture, clocks, lighting devices, and porcelain. The great French furniture designers and cabinetmakers, or ébénistes, of the 18th and 19th centuries made maximum use of the exquisite gilt-bronze mounts produced by fondeurs-ciseleurs (founders and finishers) such as the renowned Jacques Caffieri (1678–1755), whose finished gilt-bronze pieces were almost as fine as jewelers' work. Ormolu mountings attained their highest artistic and technical development in France.

Similarly fine results could be achieved for lighting devices, such as chandeliers and candelabras, as well as for the ornamental metal mounts applied to clock cases and to ceramic pieces. In the hands of the Parisian marchands-merciers, the precursors of decorators, ormolu or gilt-bronze sculptures were used for bright, non-oxidizing fireplace accessories or for Rococo or Neoclassical mantel-clocks or wall-mounted clock-cases – a specialty of Charles Cressent (1685–1768) – complemented by rock-crystal drops on gilt-bronze chandeliers and wall-lights.

The bronze mounts were cast by lost wax casting, and then chiseled and chased to add detail. Rococo gilt bronze tends to be finely cast, lightly chiseled, and part-burnished. Neoclassical gilt-bronze is often entirely chiseled and chased with extraordinary skill and delicacy to create finely varied surfaces.

The ormolu technique was extensively used in the French Empire mantel clocks, reaching its peak during this period.

Chinese and European porcelains mounted in gilt-bronze were luxury wares that heightened the impact of often-costly and ornamental ceramic pieces sometimes used for display.  Chinese ceramics with gilt-bronze mounts were produced under the guidance of the Parisian marchands-merciers, for only they had access to the ceramics (often purchased in the Netherlands) and the ability to overleap the guild restrictions. A few surviving pieces of 16th-century Chinese porcelain subsequently mounted in contemporary European silver-gilt, or vermeil, show where the foundations of the later fashion lay.

From the late 1760s, Matthew Boulton (1728–1809) of Birmingham produced English ormolu vases and perfume-burners in the latest Neoclassical style. Though the venture never became a financial success, it produced the finest English ormolu. In the early 19th century fine English ormolu came from the workshops of Benjamin Lewis Vulliamy (1780–1854).

In France, the tradition of neoclassic ormolu to Pierre-Philippe Thomire (1751–1843) was continued by Lucien-François Feuchère. Beurdeley & Cie. produced excellent ormolu in Rococo and Neoclassical styles in Paris, and rococo gilt-bronze is characteristic of the furniture of François Linke.

Gallery

See also 
 Gold plating

References and sources
References

Sources

 Swantje Koehler: Ormolu Dollhouse Accessories. Swantje-Köhler-Verlag, Bonn 2007. .

External links 

 National Pollutant Inventory – Copper and compounds fact sheet
 Kevin Brown, Artist and Patrons: Court Art and Revolution in Brussels at the end of the Ancien Regime, Dutch Crossing, Taylor and Francis ( 2017)

Gilding
Artistic techniques
Gold
Metal plating
Artworks in metal
Copper alloys
Porcelain

de:Feuervergoldung
fr:Dorure#Dorure au mercure